"The Look of Love" is a song by American singer Madonna from the soundtrack to the 1987 film Who's That Girl. It was released as the third and final single from the soundtrack on November 25, 1987, by Sire Records.  While shooting the film, then called Slammer, Madonna had requested that producer Patrick Leonard develop a downtempo song that captured the nature of her film persona. She later wrote the lyrics and melody to the backing track developed by Leonard, and the song became "The Look of Love". Madonna was also inspired by James Stewart's performance in the 1954 film Rear Window when writing the song.

Featuring instrumentation from percussion, the song begins with a low bass synth line and a slow backing track, followed by Madonna singing the lyrics. Critically appreciated as a haunting track and noted as a "gem" on the soundtrack, "The Look of Love" reached the top-ten of the charts in Belgium, Ireland, the Netherlands and the United Kingdom. It also charted in France, Germany and Switzerland, while reaching the top 20 of the European Hot 100 Singles chart. Madonna's only live performances of the song were on her Who's That Girl World Tour in 1987. During the performance Madonna pretended that she was lost on the stage, like her film character.

Background and development

In 1986, Madonna was shooting for her third motion picture Who's That Girl,  then known as Slammer. Needing songs for the soundtrack of the movie, she contacted Patrick Leonard and Stephen Bray, with whom she had written and produced her third studio album True Blue in 1986. Madonna explained to them that she needed an uptempo song and a downtempo song. She came to the studio one Thursday, as Leonard developed the chorus of the songs. He handed over that cassette to Madonna, who went to the backroom and finished the melody and the lyrics of the songs, while Leonard worked on the other parts. The uptempo song developed was "Who's That Girl", the first single from the soundtrack, and the downtempo song, developed and written the day after, was "The Look of Love". Madonna later changed the film's name from Slammer to Who's That Girl, preferring the latter. Regarding the development of the songs for the film, Madonna further explained
"I had some very specific ideas in mind, music that would stand on its own as well as support and enhance what was happening on screen and the only way to make that a reality was to have a hand in writing the tunes myself. [...] The songs aren't necessarily about Nikki [her character name in the movie] or written to be sung by someone like her, but there's a spirit to this music that captures both what the film and the characters are about, I think."
Madonna was inspired by the look that actor James Stewart gave actress Grace Kelly in the 1954 film Rear Window. Madonna said: "I can't describe it, but that is the way I want someone to look at me when he loves me. It's the most pure look of love and adoration. Like surrender. It's devastating." "The Look of Love" was released as the third single from the soundtrack in the United Kingdom, some European countries and Japan. "I Know It", a track from Madonna's self-titled debut album, appeared as the B-side. In 1989, the song was used as the B-side for the "Express Yourself" single release.

Composition

"The Look of Love" starts off with a low bass synth line and a slow backing track. It is followed by sound of percussion and a high register note, contrasting with the bassline. The song continues in this way up till the last verse, which is backed by the sound from an acoustic guitar. A two-part vocal is found in the line "No where to run, no place to hide". According to Rikky Rooksby, author of The Complete Guide to the Music of Madonna, Madonna's voice sounds "expressive" when she sings the line "From the look of love" and utters the word "look" over the D minor chord present underneath. The word is sung in a higher note of the musical scale, thus giving an impression of the suspension like quality of the minor ninth chord, dissociating it from the harmony of the other notes. The song is set in the time signature of common time, with a moderate tempo of 80 beats per minute. It is composed in the key of D minor, with Madonna's voice spanning the notes C5 to B3. "The Look of Love" has a basic sequence of C–Dm–Fm–B as its chord progression.

Critical reception

Rooksby called the song as "the other gem" of the Who's That Girl soundtrack along with "Causing a Commotion", and denoted it as "an expressive, understated track." J. Randy Taraborrelli, author of Madonna: An Intimate Biography, commented that "'The Look of Love' was an exotic ballad." Don Shewey from Rolling Stone said that the song was "so haunting that it would leave you thinking as to where your life is going." John Evan Seery, author of Political theory for mortals: shades of justice, images of death, commented that the song portrayed Madonna's "discipline of gaze". Brian Hadden from Time found the song depressing. Tiju Francis from Vibe wrote: "For a such a commonly titled song, Madonna's take does at least offer something a little different. [...] 'The Look of Love' actually sounds like part of the score – Madonna could well be singing over what was previously just the moody character development background synth music apparently present in every film in the '80s. [...]  But its slow-burn feel means the song is four minutes of not-particularly-intense brooding that never peaks – unlike a ballad." In March 2023, Billboard ranked it as the singer's 95th greatest song; Andrew Unterberger opined that its "aqueous production and mysterious melody give it an eerie quality befitting that inspiration, one of Madonna's most bewitching soundtrack compositions". The Guardians Jude Rogers called it "an occasionally interesting tide of tropical sounds".  Slant Magazines Eric Henderson wrote that "if Madonna indeed wrote this European single in part as a tribute to James Stewart's character in Rear Window, it's impossible not to wish she'd instead opted for a lilting ode to Norman Bates's mother".

Commercial performance 
"The Look of Love" was never released in the United States, and therefore did not enter any Billboard charts. In the United Kingdom, it was released on December 12, 1987, and entered the UK Singles Chart at number 15. The next week, it reached a peak of nine on the chart, her first single to miss the top five since "Lucky Star". The song was present for a total of seven weeks on the chart. According to the Official Charts Company, "The Look of Love" has sold 121,439 copies in the United Kingdom, as of August 2008. In Germany, the song debuted on the Media Control Charts at number 38 on January 24, 1988, and moved to its peak of number 34, the next week. It was present for a total of seven weeks on the chart. In Ireland, the song reached the top ten and peaked at number six. Across Europe, the song reached number nine in Belgium, number 23 in France, number eight in Netherlands and number 20 in Switzerland. On the European Hot 100 Singles, the song reached number 17.

Live performance
Madonna performed the song on her 1987 Who's That Girl World Tour. It was the seventh song of the setlist. Madonna was dressed in gold lamé pants and a sleeveless top. As she finished the performance of "Causing a Commotion", the spotlight was focused on her. The introductory music of "The Look of Love" started and Madonna roamed around the stage, pretending that she was lost. She wanted to portray her Who's That Girl character Nikki, when she was lost in a similar sequence in the film. After she finished singing the song, Madonna pretended to walk forward by pushing through the air, as the conveyor belt took her backwards, ultimately taking her away from the stage.

Track listing and formats
Germany / UK 7" Single
"The Look of Love" (LP Version) – 4:01
"I Know It" (LP Version) – 4:12

Germany / UK 12" Single and Reissue CD Maxi-Single (1995)
"The Look of Love" (LP Version) – 4:01
"I Know It" (LP Version) – 4:12
"Love Don't Live Here Anymore (LP Version)" – 4:47*

Covers
In April 2022, Australian singer-songwriter Darren Hayes released his cover version of "The Look of Love". It was included on a 12" extended remix to his comeback single "Let's Try Being in Love".

Credits and personnel
Madonna – writer, vocals, producer
Patrick Leonard – writer, producer, audio mixing
Shep Pettibone – audio mixing, additional production
Junior Vasquez – mixing engineer, audio editing
Steve Peck – mixing engineer
Alberto Tolot - photography

Credits adapted from the Who's That Girl soundtrack and 12" single liner notes.

Charts

References

Book sources

1980s ballads
1987 singles
1987 songs
Madonna songs
Pop ballads
Songs written for films
Songs written by Patrick Leonard
Songs written by Madonna
Song recordings produced by Madonna
Song recordings produced by Patrick Leonard